Eddie Gormley (born 23 October 1968) is an Irish football coach and former player who is currently manager of Cabinteely.

Early career
Educated at Cabinteely Community School where he played for the School Junior & Senior teams, and also playing schoolboy football with St Joseph's Boys, Gormley joined League of Ireland side Bray Wanderers in the summer of 1987. He made his League of Ireland debut for Bray at Derry City F.C. on the opening day of the 1987–88 League of Ireland Premier Division season on 13 September 1987. He scored his first league goal at Dalymount Park on 9 October. After only a handful of appearances Gormley impressed in a trial at Tottenham Hotspur and was signed on a three-year contract in November 1987.  During his time at Tottenham, Gormley would earn Republic of Ireland U-21 caps.  He would however not play for Tottenham's first team, outside of friendlies and testimonials.  Tottenham loaned out Gormley to Chesterfield, Motherwell and Shrewsbury Town F.C. to get some first team experience.

Doncaster Rovers
At the end of the 1989/90 season Gormley was released by Tottenham and signed by Billy Bremner for Doncaster Rovers.  Gormley inspired Doncaster to ten point lead in the league before financial circumstances saw a number of crucial players sold off, resulting in Doncaster missing out on promotion.  The following two years saw Doncaster struggle as a side without any real chance of promotion.  Gormley, however, flourished and was voted the club's Player of the Year in both 1991/92 and 1992/93 seasons. After three seasons at Doncaster, Gormley decided to return to Ireland and initially joined Drogheda United on loan at the start of the 1993/94 season.

St Patrick's Athletic
After securing his release from Doncaster Rovers, Gormley was signed by St Patrick's Athletic manager Brian Kerr in December 1993.  His debut game went relatively unnoticed as it happened to be St. Pats first home game on return to their natural home of Richmond Park after a four and half year absence.  He played on the left wing during his first season.  The following season saw Gormley move into central midfield and his performances there saw him selected on the League's All Star team.  In 1995/96 Gormley won the PFAI Player of the Year award as he drove St Pats to the league title.  He also won the Player of the Month for December 1995.

Unfortunately for Gormley and St Pats he missed a penalty in the FAI Cup final replay as Shelbourne stopped the Saints winning the double. After finishing 5th in 1996/97, Gormley captained the Saints to further league titles in 1997/98 and 1998/99.  His goal at Buckley Park to clinch the league in May 1998 as well as his lob of the Sligo keeper from the halfway line at Richmond are what he will be remembered for.

A hugely creative player with an eye for spectacular goals (Irish Times journalist Gerry Thornley called him Hagi such were the playing similarities with the Romanian footballer), his all round two footed play made him a firm fans favourite in Inchicore.  He was captain of the League of Ireland XI between 1996 and 2000. When he left in 2000 after an argument with manager Pat Dolan Pats' fans were furious. He was cheered on and off the field by them every time he played against St Pats after his very successful spell there.

He played in two 1996–97 UEFA Cup games and captained Pats in four UEFA Champions League qualifying games including a 0-0 draw at Celtic Park

End of playing career and on
Having decided to leave St Pats, Gormley re-joined his first club, Bray Wanderers.  He played for four seasons and performed admirably. In January 2003 he signed on loan for Kenny Shiels at Ballymena United and made his Irish League debut at Carrick on 8 February.

He was unable, however to help Bray reach the heights he reached with St Pats and in 2005, Gormley retired from professional football.  His last game was as a substitute on 24 June at the Belfield Bowl. After his retirement Eddie played one season for Pearse Rovers (Sallynoggin, Co Dublin) in the Leinster Senior League. After a spell as coach with, in September 2006 Gormley was appointed manager of Bray Wanderers.

On 9 August 2010, Gormley parted company with Bray Wanderers, according to the club website.

He scored a total of 21 goals in 151 appearances at the Carlisle Grounds.

Honours

Club
St Patrick's Athletic
 League of Ireland Premier Division (3):  1995-96, 1997-98, 1998-99
 FAI Super Cup (1): 1999

Individual
 PFAI Players' Player of the Year (1): 1995-96
 Doncaster Rovers Player of the Year (2): 1991-92, 1992–93

References

External links
Gormley interview from braywanderers.com, July 2002

1968 births
Association footballers from County Dublin
Bray Wanderers F.C. players
St Patrick's Athletic F.C. players
League of Ireland players
Republic of Ireland association footballers
Republic of Ireland under-21 international footballers
Republic of Ireland expatriate association footballers
Tottenham Hotspur F.C. players
Chesterfield F.C. players
Doncaster Rovers F.C. players
English Football League players
Living people
League of Ireland managers
League of Ireland XI players
Association football midfielders
Ballymena United F.C. players
Expatriate association footballers in Northern Ireland
Irish expatriate sportspeople in England
Irish expatriate sportspeople in Scotland
Expatriate footballers in England
Bray Wanderers F.C. managers
Republic of Ireland football managers